Alexander Boksenberg CBE FRS (born 18 March 1936) is a British scientist. He won the 1999 Hughes Medal of the Royal Society "for his landmark discoveries concerning the nature of active galactic nuclei, the physics of the intergalactic medium and of the interstellar gas in primordial galaxies. He is noted also for his exceptional contributions to the development of astronomical instrumentation including the Image Photon Counting System, a revolutionary electronic area detector for the detection of faint sources, which gave a major impetus to optical astronomy in the United Kingdom".

He later served as the Director of the Royal Greenwich Observatory.

Minor planet 3205 Boksenberg is named in his honor.

He won the Richard Glazebrook Medal and Prize in 2000.

References

Commanders of the Order of the British Empire
Fellows of the Royal Society
Living people
British physicists
Fellows of Churchill College, Cambridge
People educated at the Stationers' Company's School
1936 births